Hey, Pop! is a 1932 American pre-Code comedy film starring Fatty Arbuckle, and the first under Arbuckle's new contract with Warner Brothers.

Cast
 Roscoe 'Fatty' Arbuckle as Fatty the Chef
 Billy Heyes as Bill
 Connie Almy as Landlady
 Jack Shutta as Restaurant owner
 Dan Wolheim as Orphanage official
 Herschel Mayall as Contest judge

See also
 Fatty Arbuckle filmography

External links

1932 films
1932 comedy films
1932 short films
American black-and-white films
Films directed by Alfred J. Goulding
Films produced by Samuel Sax
Vitaphone short films
American comedy short films
Warner Bros. short films
1930s American films